Sean Rowlands (born 12 September 1966) is a British former field hockey player who competed in the 1992 Summer Olympics.

Rowlands studied at Durham University and represented England Under 21's at field hockey while still an undergraduate.

References

External links
 

1966 births
Living people
British male field hockey players
Olympic field hockey players of Great Britain
Field hockey players at the 1992 Summer Olympics
Loughborough Students field hockey players
1990 Men's Hockey World Cup players
Alumni of Durham University